A. Schulman was an American supplier of plastic compounding products, color concentrates, and additives before its acquisition by LyondellBasell in 2018.

Products
The company's products include:
 Low (LDPE) and high (HDPE) density polyethylenes under the Polyflam brand
 Polystyrene (PS), polypropylene (PP) and polyphenylenesulphide (PPS) also under the Polyflam brand
 Several derivaterized styrene polymers (ABS, Methyl Methacrylate Acrylonitrile Butadiene Styrene (MABS) and blends (ABS/PA, PC/ABS), polymethylmethacrylate (PMMA), and polycarbonate (PC) and blends (PC/PBT), under the Polyman brand
 Polyacetyls (POM) under the Schulaform brand
 Polyamides PA6 and PA66 under the Schulamid brand
 Polybutylene terephthalate (PBT) under the Schuladur A brand
 Polyurethane (PUR) under the Polypur brand
 Polyvinyl chloride (PVC) under the Polyvin brand
 Styrene acrylonitrile copolymer (SAN) under the Polyfort brand

History
The company was founded in 1928 by Alex Schulman by selling rubber products from a plant in Akron, Ohio.

In 1972, the company became a public company via an initial public offering.

In 1994, the company acquired Comalloy International, a subsidiary of Exxon based in Nashville, Tennessee.

In February 1995, the company acquired Texas Polymer Services.

In 1996, the company acquired the Specialty Compounding Division of Laurel Industries Inc., from Occidental Petroleum.

In 2007, the company acquired Delta Plast Group, based in Sweden.
 
In February 2008, the Company closed its facility in St. Thomas, Ontario.

In 2009, the company opened a Polybatch plant in Akron, Ohio.

In 2010, the company acquired McCann Color and closed its facility in Sharon Center, Ohio.

In April 2010, the company acquired ICO for $191 million.

Also in 2010, the company acquired Mash Compostos Plasticos of Brazil.

In 2016, the company sued the former owners of Citadel Plastics, a company it had previously acquired, for $272 million, claiming that they falsified information about the recycled content and other attributes of its products and that A. Schulman later had to stop selling these products.

References

External links
 A. Schulman website

1928 establishments in Ohio
2018 disestablishments in Ohio
2018 mergers and acquisitions
American companies established in 1928
American companies disestablished in 2018
Chemical companies established in 1928
Chemical companies disestablished in 2018
Chemical companies of the United States
Manufacturing companies based in Ohio